Muqaddar is a 2017 Indian Bhojpuri-language action-romance-musical drama film written and directed by Sekhar Sharma and produced by Wasim S. Khan. The film stars Khesari Lal Yadav and Kajal Raghwani are in  lead roles, while Shubhi Sharma, Shamim Khan, Awadhesh Mishra, Baleshwar Singh, C P Bhatt, Prakash Jais, Ayaz Khan, J Neelam, Nagesh Mishra, Hemant Samrat, Abhay Rai, Nasir Khan and Santosh Verma are in supporting roles.

Cast
Khesari Lal Yadav as Khesari Lal Yadav
Kajal Raghwani as Kajal Raghwani
Shubhi Sharma
Shamim Khan as Munna
Awadhesh Mishra
Ayaz Khan as Digvijay
Prakash Jais as Alam, Khesari's Manager
Baleshwar Singh
C P Bhatt
J Neelam
Sanjay Verma
Nagesh Mishra
Anita Sahgal
Abhay Rai
Hemant Samrat
Nasir Khan

Production
Filming was this film mostly scenes shot in Lucknow famous palaces like Ambedkar Memorial Park, Janeshwar Mishra Park and Ramvihar Colony.

The cinematography has been done by Pramod Pandey while choreography is by Sanjay Korve. Art direction done by Nazir Shaikh. it was edited by Ashfaq Makrani and its action director is Kaushal Moses. Dress designed by Sayyed Sajid, while sound designed by Madan Kumar Singh. Post-production done by Trisha Studio Mumbai.

Release
The film is released on Chhath  (26 October 2017) in the major areas of Bihar and Jharkhand. The Uttar Pradesh Government have subsided the taxes on the film.

Soundtrack

The music for "Muqaddar" was composed by Madhukar Anand with lyrics penned by Pyare Lal Yadav, Azad Singh, Arvind Tiwari and Pawan Pandey. It was produced under the "Wave Music". The soundtrack was released in "Wave Music" label, which consists of 9 songs. The full album is recorded by Khesari Lal Yadav, Priyanka Singh, Indu Sonali, Honey B, Mohan Rathod, Madhukar Anand and Ranjeeta.

His first song "Saj Ke Sawar Ke" released on 1 October 2017, second song "Horha Ke Chana" released on 9 October 2017, third song " Phoolwa Sukhal Ba" released on 17 October 2017, fourth song "Sahjada Ke Sang Sahajadi" released on 17 October 2017 at official YouTube handle of Wave Music and he gots 125 millions, 65 millions, 44 millions and 98 millions views respectively. All song of this film are superhit on YouTube.

Marketing
The film online stream on online video platform site YouTube 3 March 2018 at where song unveiled. He trend number one on YouTube by beating Rajnikant's film teaser, he got 4 millions views on YouTube in just 2 days. As of May 2020, it got than 49 millions views on YouTube till now.

References

2017 films
2010s Bhojpuri-language films